Kfar Hasidim (lit. Village of Hasidim), also known as Kfar Hasidim Alef to distinguish it from Kfar Hasidim Bet, is a moshav in northern Israel. Located near Kiryat Ata, it falls under the jurisdiction of Zevulun Regional Council.

History

Ottoman-period village of Harbaj
During the Ottoman period there was a Muslim village called Harbaj at this place. In 1162 A.H. (~1748 CE) it was fortified by Zahir al-Umar, and traces of the wall still existed in the late 19th century. The village appeared as El Harchieh on the map that Pierre Jacotin compiled in 1799.

In 1875, Victor Guérin found here about 30 inhabited houses. In the centre of the village was a large well, partly filled. In 1881, the Palestine Exploration Fund's Survey of Western Palestine described El Harbaj as "a small adobe village, on the plain, with a well to the north and olives to the east."

A population list from about 1887 showed that el Harbaj had about 75 inhabitants; all Muslims.

British Mandate period

Harbaj village
In the 1922 census of Palestine conducted by the British Mandate authorities, Harbaj had a population 177, all Muslims.

Kfar Hasidim and the end of Harbaj

Kfar Hasidim was founded in 1924 by two groups of Polish Hasidic immigrants of the Fourth Aliyah, followers of Rabbi Yehezkel Taub and Rabbi Israel Hoffstein, the rabbis of Yablono and Kozienice. They bought land east of Haifa Bay with the help of Rabbi Yeshayahu Shapira of Hapoel Hamizrachi and established Nahalat Ya’akov and Avodat Yisrael, which later merged into Kfar Hasidim.

In 1925 the Palestine Jewish Colonization Association purchased 70 feddans in Harbaj from Alexander Sursuk, as part of a larger series of land purchases from the Sursuk family of Beirut. At the time, there were 50 families living there. From 1931, and lasting several years, the Jewish Agency struggled to evict the tenant farmers from Harbaj, from the land which was to become Kfar Hasidim.

In the 1931 census, Kfar Hassidim had a population of 420, all Jews, in a total of 104 houses.
By the 1945 statistics, Kfar Hasidim had 980 residents, all Jewish.

In 1935, Makhouly visited Tal Harbaj on behalf of the Department of Antiquities. He noted that: "the portion of the outer wall on the eastern top of the site was demolished and all stones from it were taken away."

State of Israel
In 1950, Kfar Hasidim Bet was established nearby by non-agricultural residents of Kfar Hasidim.

Kfar HaNoar HaDati youth village, founded in 1937, lies adjacent to the moshav. Yityish Titi Aynaw, an Ethiopian Jew who won the Miss Israel beauty pageant in 2013, was a graduate of the school.

The immigrant absorption center in Kfar Hasidim is the first stop for members of the Bnei Menashe community from North-Eastern India who settle in Israel.

Prominent residents
Shlomo Goren, future head of the Military Rabbinate of the Israel Defense Forces and subsequently Ashkenazi Chief Rabbi of Israel from 1973 to 1983, was raised in Kfar Hasidim, which his father helped to found.

References

Bibliography

External links 
Survey of Western Palestine, Map 5:    IAA, Wikimedia commons

Hasidic Judaism in Israel
Moshavim
Populated places established in 1924
1924 establishments in Mandatory Palestine
Populated places in Haifa District
Polish-Jewish culture in Israel